Military structure 
Coast Guard Station Provincetown
1st District
location:Provincetown, Massachusetts
Heavy weather Coast Guard Station
built: 1977-1979
builder: symmes maini & mckee associates inc
used: 1979-Present
The station is NOT open to the public

United States Coast Guard Station Provincetown is a United States Coast Guard station located in Provincetown, Massachusetts. 

The station is a sub-unit of Sector Southeast New England.

See also
List of military installations in Massachusetts

External links
Welcome to the U.S. Coast Guard First District

Provincetown, Massachusetts
United States Coast Guard stations
Buildings and structures in Barnstable County, Massachusetts
Military installations in Massachusetts